Pincher Martin (published in America as Pincher Martin: The Two Deaths of Christopher Martin) is a novel by British writer William Golding, first published in 1956. It is Golding's third novel, following The Inheritors and his debut Lord of the Flies.

The novel is one of Golding's best-known novels, and is noted for being existential and minimalistic in setting.

Plot
The plot of Pincher Martin surrounds the survival and psychophysical, spiritual and existential plight of one Christopher Hadley "Pincher" Martin, a temporary naval lieutenant who believes himself to be the sole survivor of a military torpedo destroyer which sinks in the North Atlantic Ocean. At the start of the novel Martin is in the water and desperately fighting for his life. He is apparently saved after being providentially washed ashore a rocky mid-Atlantic islet. He deduces that his naval crew is dead and begins his grim struggle for survival but, as time goes by, a series of strange and increasingly terrifying events, which he at first dismisses as hallucinations, slowly provokes in him an existential crisis.

Throughout the novel Golding juxtaposes themes of sanity and insanity, and reality and unreality. At first Martin is portrayed as a thinking individual, who uses his intelligence, education and training to source food, collect fresh water and alert any potential rescuers. It is in fact during this rational phase that Martin is at his most delusional. It is only when insanity takes hold that he begins to comprehend the reality of his predicament: "There is a pattern emerging. I do not know what the pattern is but even my dim guess at it makes my reason falter".

The novel's twist ending reveals that Martin actually drowned shortly after his ship was sunk. When his body is found it is noted that "he didn't even have time to kick off his seaboots". This means that his struggle for survival on the island never actually happened, which changes the work into an allegory of purgatory and damnation. In the Radio Times of 21 March 1958, Golding explains that Martin driven by a selfish greed for life has continued to exist in another dimension: "His drowned body lies rolling in the Atlantic but the ravenous ego invents a rock for him to endure on".

Setting
The North Atlantic islet in question is described in the novel as very small, rocky, barren and remote, "only appearing on weather charts". ("A single point of rock, peak of a mountain range, one tooth set in the ancient jaw of a sunken world, projecting through the inconceivable vastness of the whole ocean.") A captain is quoted as saying "I call that name a near miss." It is due to these descriptions that a number of critics and reviewers proposed that the setting provided is that of Rockall, which seems to fit the definitions given.

References

1956 British novels
1956 fantasy novels
Existentialist novels
Novels by William Golding
Novels set on uninhabited islands
Castaways in fiction
Faber and Faber books
Fiction about purgatory